Demetrius La Vell "Dee" Harvey (August 24, 1965 – December 1, 2012) was an American R&B singer. He was at one time signed to Motown Label and recorded his first album, Just as I Am with Motown in 1991.

Harvey was born in Memphis, Tennessee, and attended Trezevant High School. Harvey was best known for his 1991 hit "Leave Well Enough Alone", which reached #61 on the US R&B chart, and his 1992 hit "Just As I Am" (#68 R&B).

Harvey also sang with Harry Belafonte in 1989. During his career he also sang with Aaron Neville and Dionne Warwick among others. In 2010, he mainly performed as a backup singer to Rod Stewart.  He also performed and sang  two songs, "In the Middle" and "Are You Ready for Me", on the soundtrack of  the 1991 movie The Five Heartbeats directed by Robert Townsend.

Dee Harvey died at age 47 in California.

References 

1965 births
2012 deaths
20th-century American singers
20th-century African-American male singers
American contemporary R&B singers
Motown artists
Singers from Memphis, Tennessee
20th-century American male singers
21st-century African-American people